The Nokia 9210 Communicator is a third-generation Communicator series smartphone produced by Nokia, announced on 21 November 2000 and released in June 2001. It greatly improved on the second generation Nokia 9110 Communicator, providing a colour main screen and using an ARM processor. It is one of the few mobile phones able to send and receive fax.

It was the first device to run on the Symbian OS platform, version 6, succeeding version 5 of EPOC. It also introduced Nokia's Series 80 interface, which was the result of Symbian Ltd.'s 'Crystal' design.

It is used as a normal though bulky mobile phone in closed mode; when it is flipped open it can be used like a very small notebook computer with a 640 × 200 screen. The earpiece and microphone are located on the back so one must hold it with the front screen and keypad facing out to make a call. The phone also has speakerphone functionality.

The 9210 Communicator's success helped Nokia overtake both Palm and Compaq to become the leading 'mobile data device' vendor in Western Europe in the third quarter of 2001, when it had a 28.3 percent share in the market.

Specifications
 Main applications: mobile phone, desk application, messaging (SMS, fax, email), Internet (web, WAP), contacts (address book), calendar, office (word processor, spreadsheet, presentation viewer, file manager)
 Extra applications: calculator, clock, games, recorder, and unit converter. In addition, 3rd party software developers could freely implement new applications for the Nokia 9210 Communicator and offer them for download by the users.
 Processor: 32-bit 66 MHz ARM9-based RISC CPU
 Radio: foldout antenna for improved reception.
 Operating system: Symbian OS v6.0, Series 80 v1.0
 Interface: IrDA but no Bluetooth, Serial port cable for PC.
 Audio: Stereo-headset, mp3-player software is optional, additional internal speaker for music and full-duplex speakerphone functionality.
 Includes PC Suite for the Nokia 9210 Communicator, running on Windows platform.
 Vibrating alert: not implemented.

9210i
The 9210i launched in 2002 increased the internal memory to 40 MB, video streaming and Flash 5 support for the web browser. The main screen backlight was also changed from high voltage CCFL tube light to LED backlight, which was quite new technology at the time.

Replacement models
Nokia replaced the 9210 in first quarter of 2005 with:
 Nokia 9500 – has additional features (Wi-Fi and camera) but is smaller (148 mm × 57 mm × 24 mm) and lighter (222 g), and has an updated Symbian Series 80 operating system.
 Nokia 9300 – is smaller (132 mm × 51 mm × 21 mm) and lighter (167 g) than Nokia 9210, with similar features and the same operating system as the Nokia 9500.

Both new models include other improvements such as: EDGE, colour external displays and Bluetooth.

Accessories
 Camera
 Hands free car kit

Nokia 9290
The American variant is the Nokia 9290, first introduced on 5 June 2001 and eventually, after a year-long delay, released on the continent in June 2002.

See also 
 Ericsson R380
 Nokia 7650
 List of Nokia products

References 

 Nokia 9210 info site

Nokia smartphones
Symbian devices
Mobile phones with an integrated hardware keyboard
Mobile phones with infrared transmitter
Flip phones